Marwan Mohamed Moustafa Dawoud Soliman (born 27 August 1997) is an Egyptian professional footballer who plays as a defender for the Egyptian national team.

International career

He was included in the final-23 squad to participate for the 2021 FIFA Arab Cup on 20 November 2021., as he debuted 1 December in a match against Lebanon in a 1-0 victory.

On 11 December, Dawoud scored his first goal for Egypt against Jordan at extra-time in a 3-1 victory.

International goals

References

External links
 

1997 births
Living people
Egyptian footballers
Egypt international footballers
Association football defenders